Nanton District is one of the sixteen districts in Northern Region, Ghana. Originally it was formerly part of the then-larger Savelugu-Nanton District in 1988, which was created from the former West Dagomba District Council, until the southern part of the district was split off to create Nanton District on 15 March 2018; thus the remaining part has been renamed as Savelugu Municipal District. The district is located in the northwest part of Northern Region and has Nanton as its capital town.

Villages 

Nanton
Tampion
Tinkurugu
Zieng
Balishei

References 

 

Districts of the Northern Region (Ghana)